Mom and Other Loonies in the Family is a 2015 Hungarian-German-Bulgarian drama film directed by Ibolya Fekete that tells the story of four generations of Hungarian women spanning the twentieth century.

Cast and characters
 Eszter Ónodi as Berta Gardó (mother
 Tibor Gáspár as Lajos Barkó (father)
 György Barkó as Sándor Mille (great-grandfather)
 Juli Básti as young Berta / Rozál Mille
 Danuta Szaflarska as Berta, aged 92

References

External links
 

2015 drama films
2015 films
Hungarian drama films
German drama films
Bulgarian drama films
2010s German films